The  is a traditional Brazilian dessert. The origin of the dessert is uncertain, but the most common theory is that it was created by a confectioner from Rio de Janeiro, Heloisa Nabuco de Oliveira, to promote the presidential candidacy of Eduardo Gomes. It is made of condensed milk, cocoa powder, butter, and chocolate sprinkles covering the outside layer.

It is a popular confection throughout the country, especially for festive events.  are commonly made at home, and also found in bakeries and snack shops. A  is generally shaped into small balls covered in chocolate sprinkles and placed in a small cupcake liner.

In recent years, flavor and coating variations on the traditional chocolate  have become popular. This variation of flavors and easy manipulation of the original dessert lead into a trend of different recipes, such as cakes, tarts, ice cream or even bread.

History
The origin of the name "Brigadeiro" is linked to the presidential campaign of Brigadier Eduardo Gomes, UDN candidate for the Presidency of the Republic in 1946. Heloísa Nabuco de Oliveira, a member of a traditional carioca family who supported the brigadier's candidacy, created a new confection, and named it after the candidate. The doce do brigadeiro (lit. brigadier's candy) became popular, and the name was eventually shortened to just "brigadeiro." Women at the time would sell brigadeiro in support of the presidential candidate as it was the first national election in which women were able to vote.

Despite the support received, Eduardo Gomes was defeated, and the election was won by then General Eurico Gaspar Dutra.

In the South of Brazil, brigadeiros are most commonly known as negrinhos, and one researcher traced its origins back to the 1920s, when condensed milk by Nestlé started being sold in Brazil.

Gallery

See also 

 Beijinho
 List of Brazilian sweets and desserts
 Bourbon ball
 Chokladboll
 Chocolate truffle
 Rum ball

References

External links 

Brigadeiro recipe (in English)

Brazilian confectionery
Chocolate desserts